The Abramovich Flyer was an early aircraft built by Russian aviator Vsevolod Mikhailovich Abramovich in 1912, based on the Wright brothers' designs he had seen while working for their German subsidiary. Differences from the Wright designs of the time included wheeled undercarriage and conventional empennage replacing the canard the Wrights used. Abramovich retained the wing warping technique the Wrights used for banking the aircraft, but controlled this with a control stick rather than the hip-controlled harness of the Wrights' design.  Using this aircraft, Abramovich was successful in setting many early aviation records in Russia, including carrying several passengers.

Specifications

Biplanes
1910s Russian experimental aircraft
Wright brothers
Single-engined pusher aircraft